Saskia Post (1 August 1960 – 16 March 2020) was a US-born Australian actress. She is best known for her leading role in the 1986 film Dogs in Space. Post also acted in the 1985 film Bliss and the 1991 film Proof, as well as numerous Australian television series.

Biography 
Saskia Post was born in Martinez, California, in 1961. Her Dutch parents moved between America and Japan, before settling in Australia in 1975. At high school she studied acting and singing and after completing high school she spent a year attending acting workshops and dance classes in Sydney. Post then commenced a degree course in drama and arts at the University of New South Wales but gave it up after 12 months to attend a full-time course at the Drama Studio in 1981. Shortly after completing the course she obtained her first television role as Julianna Sleven, a Dutch refugee, in The Sullivans, an Australian drama television series about an average middle-class Melbourne family and the effect World War II had on their lives. Post moved to Melbourne and worked on the series for 12 months before leaving in 1984 to take part in the John Duigan film One Night Stand, in which she played Eva, a Czech-born bank teller.
 
In 1985, Post appeared in the AFI Award winning film Bliss as Honey Barbara's daughter. This was followed in 1986 with a feature role in the Richard Lowenstein film Dogs in Space, a story about a group of young musicians and music fans sharing a house in the inner Melbourne suburb of Richmond. In the film Post played the role of Anna, the girlfriend of Sam (Michael Hutchence).
 
Post also appeared in numerous stage productions in Melbourne and Sydney, including Hating Alison Ashley, Salome, Endgrain, Train to Transcience, Could I Have this Dance?, In Angel Gear, Figures in Glass, Skin and Vincent in Brixton.

Post also worked as a transpersonal art therapist and educator.

Post died following a cardiac arrest at the Alfred Hospital in Melbourne on 16 March 2020.

Filmography

References

External links
 
Official Michael Hutchence Memorial Website | Saskia Post

1961 births
2020 deaths
People from Martinez, California
Actresses from California
20th-century Australian actresses
American emigrants to Australia
Australian people of Dutch descent
21st-century American women